Ali Khan Mahmudabad, (born 2 December 1982) is an Indian historian, political scientist, writer, columnist, occasional poet, and assistant professor of both history and political science at Ashoka University, India. He is the grandson of Mohammad Amir Ahmad Khan, the last Raja of Mahmudabad,

Background and early life
His father, Sulaiman, Raja of Mahmudabad, is the only son of the notorious Mohammad Amir Ahmad Khan, last ruling Raja of Mahmudabad, long-time treasurer and major financier of the Muslim League in the years leading up to the partition of India. Ali's mother, Rani Vijay, a Hindu by birth, is the daughter of Jagat Singh Mehta and sister of Vikram Mehta.

Ali grew up in Mahmudabad, India. He received his Bachelor of Arts degree from Amherst College where he graduated with a double major in history and political science in the year 2006. Following this, he studied advanced level Arabic from the University of Damascus. By 2010, he had earned an MPhil in Historical Studies from the University of Cambridge (Girton College, Cambridge), and by 2014, he also secured his PhD in history from Cambridge. His dissertation was on "Rhetorics and Spaces of Belonging among North Indian Muslims, 1850- 1950" under supervision of Professor Sir Christopher Bayly and Professor Javed Majeed.

Education
Ali did his schooling up until the 5th grade from La Martiniere Lucknow, following which he went to England to study at King's College School till 1996. He graduated school from Winchester College in the year 2001 and began his university studies at Amherst College, where he played for the Varsity Squash Team. He graduated from Amherst, with a thesis on 'Iran and the evolution of Velayat-e-faqih Islamic Jurisprudence'. 

His PhD at Cambridge focused on the formation of Muslim political identity in North India between 1850–1950. In particular, the thesis presented a history of the public space of poetry (the Mushaira) and a genealogy of the idea of homeland (watan) over these hundred years. Some of the other subjects relevant to his thesis are ideas of citizenship, patriotism, global Muslim identities and their relevance in the articulation and configuration of Muslim ideas of selfhood. Although he explores these primarily in the context of South Asia, most of these ideas are increasingly relevant in all parts of the Muslim world and a prominent part of debates around political reforms and public policy.

Before his PhD, he secured his MPhil, also from Cambridge. He wrote a thesis on trans-national Shi‘a Muslim networks in the early 20th century between South Asia and the Middle East which got published in the Journal of the Royal Asiatic Society and became a part of the book: The Shi‘a in Modern South Asian.

Prior to going to Cambridge, Ali studied Arabic at the University of Damascus in Syria. In addition to attending classes at the university, he wrote extensively about Syria for various print and online newspapers and magazines and also travelled widely not only in Syria. Since then he has undertaken research and travelled more extensively in the wider region and has spent substantial time in Iran and Iraq amongst other places. His travels have led to him writing for publications such as the National Geographic (magazine).

Career
Writing under the pen name of Ali Khan Mahmudabad, he has a column in Urdu for the national daily The Inquilab in India. He also writes regularly for a number of online and print publications, including the Caravan Magazine, The Indian Express, Times of India, The Outlook Magazine, Hindustan Times, Business Standard, Daily News and Analysis, Tehelka magazine and The Sunday Guardian in India. He also writes for a number of publications from other parts of the world like The Guardian, The Straits Times, Huffington Post, and OpenDemocracy. His writings focus on political, social, economic and security issues amongst others in South Asia and the Middle East.

He also spends time lecturing in schools, colleges and universities as well as advising policy think-tanks on a wide range of subjects including political, religious and security related issues in South Asia as well as greater West Asia (the Middle East). In 2010, he received the Evan Carroll Commager Fellowship from Amherst College. He is fluent in English, Hindi, Urdu, Awadhi, Arabic, Persian and French. In 2017, he joined the Samajwadi Party.

Works 
Besides being a columnist for Sahāfat (Urdu newspaper) and Aalami Samay (Urdu magazine), Ali has also contributed to the following books:
 A Leaf Turns Yellow: the Sufis of Awadh: "Reliving a Sacrifice"  
 Lucknow: a city between cultures: "Lucknow: a binding legacy" 
 The Shi‘a in Modern South Asian: "Local nodes of a trans-national network: a case study of a Shi‘i family in Awadh 1900- 1950"
 Poetry of Belonging: Muslim Imaginings of India 1850–1950

References 

1982 births
Scholars from Uttar Pradesh
Living people
Indian political scientists
People from Sitapur district
Indian columnists
Indian historians of Islam
21st-century Indian historians
Occasional poets